Arnold Peter Kirsch-Korff (2 August 1870 – 2 June 1944) was an Austrian-born American Hollywood actor and director. He appeared in a number of German and Austrian films before moving to the United States and resuming his career in America. He made his first appearance on the American stage in Denver in 1892.

Selected filmography 

 Hannerl and Her Lovers (1921)
 Ilona (1921)
 Roswolsky's Mistress (1921)
 The Inheritance of Tordis (1921)
 The Story of a Maid (1921)
 Nights of Terror (1921)
 The Haunted Castle (1921)
 Lola Montez, the King's Dancer (1922)
 Power of Temptation (1922)
 The Curse of Silence (1922)
 Miss Julie (1922)
 Victims of Passion (1922)
 Sins of Yesterday (1922)
 The Lost Shoe (1923)
 The Secret of the Duchess (1923)
 The Final Mask (1924)
 Athletes (1925)
 The Dice Game of Life (1925)
 Hussar Fever (1925)
 Den of Iniquity (1925)
 The Humble Man and the Chanteuse (1925)
 The Convicted (1927)
 Dancing Vienna (1927)
 The Woman in the Cupboard (1927)
 The Field Marshal (1927)
 The Famous Woman (1927)
 Alpine Tragedy (1927)
 Guilty (1928)
 The Green Monocle (1929)
 The Royal Family of Broadway (1930)
 An American Tragedy (1931)
Secrets of the French Police (1932)
Black Moon (1934)
Three Kids and a Queen (1935)

References

External links 

1870 births
1944 deaths
American male film actors
American male silent film actors
Austrian male film actors
Austrian male silent film actors
Male actors from Vienna
20th-century American male actors
20th-century Austrian male actors
Austro-Hungarian emigrants to the United States